The dwarf cuckoo (Coccycua pumila) is a tropical American bird species of the cuckoo family (Cuculidae).

It was formerly placed in the genus Coccyzus or Micrococcyx. Following the discovery that it belongs to a distinct lineage around the little cuckoo, the genus Coccycua has been reinstated for these.

It is found in Brazil, Colombia, Panama, and Venezuela. Its natural habitats are subtropical or tropical dry forest, subtropical or tropical moist lowland forest, and heavily degraded former forest.

References

dwarf cuckoo
Birds of Colombia
Birds of Venezuela
dwarf cuckoo
Taxonomy articles created by Polbot